The Voice Senior (season 2) began airing on 2 January 2021 on TVP 2. It airs on Saturdays at 20:00 and at 21:10.

Andrzej Piaseczny and Alicja Majewska returned as coaches for the second season of the show alongside newcomers Izabela Trojanowska and Witold Paszt, replaced Marek Piekarczyk and Urszula Dudziak. Rafał Brzozowski, who replaced Tomasz Kammel, hosted the show with Marta Manowska.

Presenters

Rafał Brzozowski, who replaced Tomasz Kammel, hosted the show with Marta Manowska.

Coaches

On August 17, 2020, it was announced that Alicja Majewska and Andrzej Piaseczny returned as the coaches in the second season of the show, meanwhile new coaches Izabela Trojanowska and Witold Paszt replaced Marek Piekarczyk and Urszula Dudziak in a new season.

Teams
Color key

Blind auditions
Color keys

Episode 1 (January 2, 2021)

Episode 2 (January 2, 2021)

Episode 3 (January 9, 2021)

Episode 4 (January 9, 2021)

Episode 5 (January 16, 2021)

Episode 6 (January 16, 2021)

Episode 7 (January 23, 2021)

Episode 8 (January 23, 2021)

Semi-final
Semi-final round aired on January 30, 2021.

The top 8 contestants then moved on to the final.

Colour key

1st part

2nd part

Final 

Colour key:

Final  - announcement of results 

Colour key:

References

The Voice of Poland